The Baradostian culture was an Upper Paleolithic flint industry culture found in the Zagros region in the border-country between Iraq and Iran. It was preceded by the Middle Paleolithic Mousterian culture, directly overlying it without an intervening bladelet industry. This culture is known for the high percentage of burins and some of these were similar to the distinctive nosed profile of the Aurignacian burins. Baradost is one of the mountains in the Zagros Mountains in Iraq.

Characteristics 
Radiocarbon dates suggest that this was one of the earliest Upper Paleolithic complexes, beginning perhaps as early as 36,000 BC. Evidence found in the Yafteh cave assemblages, revealed that the early phase of this culture was not as sophisticated as the evolved middle phase, and it produced blades and bladelets using soft hammer from single platform prismatic cores with plain platforms.

The Baradostian's relationship to neighbouring cultures remains unclear. This is also the case regarding the issue of whether this culture gradually evolved from the previous Zagros Mousterian cultural group, which is associated primarily with the Neanderthals, or whether early modern humans brought to the Zagros region the technologies linked to the Baradostian.

Shanidar Cave in Iraqi Kurdistan, Warwasi rock-shelter, Kaldar Cave and Yafteh Cave in the western Zagros, and Eshkaft-e Gavi Cave in the southern Zagros are among the major sites to have been excavated. Perhaps precipitated by the most recent cold phase (the Würm glaciation) of the current ice age, the Baradostian was replaced by a local Epipaleolithic industry called the Zarzian culture. The Baradostian tool tradition marks the end of the Zagros Paleolithic sequence.

According to M. Otte, the Baradostian of the Zagros clearly belongs to Aurignacian traditions.

Notes

External links
 Benco et al. Asia, Western. From Encyclopedia of Human Evolution and Prehistory, 2nd ed; E. Delson, I. Tattersall, J. A.Van Couvering and A. S. Brooks, eds. Garland: New York, 2000.
 S. E. Churchill and F. H. Smith. Makers of the early Aurignacian of Europe. American Journal of Physical Anthropology. Vol.113(S31): 61 - 115.

Industries (archaeology)
Archaeological cultures of West Asia
Upper Paleolithic cultures of Asia
Archaeological cultures in Iran
Archaeological cultures in Iraq